Tania Marguerite Dickinson  (born 1946) is a British archaeologist specialising in early-medieval Britain. Dickinson undertook undergraduate study at St. Anne's College, Oxford and postgraduate study at the Institute of Archaeology (Oxford). Her doctoral thesis, titled The Anglo-Saxon burial sites of the upper Thames region, and their bearing on the history of Wessex, circa AD 400-700, was supervised by Sonia Chadwick Hawkes and Christopher Hawkes (for the first year).

In 1973 she was appointed Lecturer in Archaeology at University College, Cardiff before moving to the University York as a lecturer in 1979. She remained at York until her retirement in 2011. Dickinson was one of the lead researchers on, and Chair of, the Staffordshire Hoard Research Project (2014-2015). The final report for the project was published in September 2019.

Select publications

  
1993. 'Early Saxon saucer brooches: a preliminary overview', in W. Filmer‑Sankey (ed.), Anglo‑Saxon Studies in Archaeology and History 6, 11–44.
2005. 'Symbols of protection: the significance of animal-ornamented shields in Early Anglo-Saxon England', Medieval Archaeology 49, 109–163.
2011. 'Overview: mortuary ritual', in H. Hamerow, D. Hinton and S. Crawford (eds.), The Oxford Handbook of Anglo-Saxon Archaeology. Oxofrd, Oxford University Press.pp221–237.
2014. 'Jewellery', in M. Lapidge, J. Blair, S. Keynes and D. Scragg (eds.), The Wiley Blackwell Encyclopaedia of Anglo-Saxon England, Chichester, John Wiley & Sons. pp263–267.
2019. Editor, with Chris Fern and Leslie Webster. The Staffordshire Hoard: An Anglo-Saxon Treasure. London, Society of Antiquaries of London.

References

External links
Tania Dickinson's publications as listed on the Archaeology Data Service

British women archaeologists
British archaeologists
Fellows of the Society of Antiquaries of London
21st-century archaeologists
Academics of the University of York
Alumni of St Anne's College, Oxford
Medieval archaeologists
1946 births
Living people